Zahid Husain (1893 – 1957) was the founder and the first governor of State Bank of Pakistan from June 1948 to July 1953. He also served as Pakistan's first High Commissioner to India from August 1947 to April 1948.

He was close aide of Quaid-e-Azam Muhammad Ali Jinnah, and also the father of Supreme Court of Pakistan Justice (R) Nasir Aslam Zahid.

Career
Zahid served as vice-chancellor of Aligarh Muslim University, the founding Governor of the State Bank of Pakistan and the first chairman of the Planning Commission besides being the author of Pakistan's first five-year plan.

See also
 Governor of the State Bank of Pakistan

References

External links
 State Bank of Pakistan Past Governors
Profile of Zahid Husain

Government Islamia College alumni
Pakistani civil servants
Governors of the State Bank of Pakistan
1890s births
1957 deaths
Vice-Chancellors of the Aligarh Muslim University
High Commissioners of Pakistan to India
Pakistan Movement activists